Zheleznodorozhny (masculine), Zheleznodorozhnaya (feminine), or Zheleznodorozhnoye (neuter), literally meaning "pertaining to rail transport", is the name of several inhabited localities in Russia.

Modern localities
Urban localities
Zheleznodorozhny, Ust-Ilimsky District, Irkutsk Oblast, a work settlement in Ust-Ilimsky District of Irkutsk Oblast
Zheleznodorozhny, Kaliningrad Oblast, an urban-type settlement in Pravdinsky District of Kaliningrad Oblast

Rural localities
Zheleznodorozhny, Arkhangelsk Oblast, a settlement under the administrative jurisdiction of Urdoma Urban-Type Settlement with Jurisdictional Territory in Lensky District of Arkhangelsk Oblast
Zheleznodorozhny, Republic of Bashkortostan, a selo in Zheleznodorozhny Selsoviet of Beloretsky District in the Republic of Bashkortostan
Zheleznodorozhny, Usolsky District, Irkutsk Oblast, a settlement in Usolsky District of Irkutsk Oblast
Zheleznodorozhny, Ivanovo Oblast, a selo in Ivanovsky District of Ivanovo Oblast
Zheleznodorozhny, Kaluga Oblast, a railway crossing loop in Khvastovichsky District of Kaluga Oblast
Zheleznodorozhny, Kursk Oblast, a settlement in Snizhansky Selsoviet of Dmitriyevsky District in Kursk Oblast
Zheleznodorozhny, Podolsky District, Moscow Oblast, a settlement in Lagovskoye Rural Settlement of Podolsky District in Moscow Oblast; 
Zheleznodorozhny, Nizhny Novgorod Oblast, a settlement in Sitnikovsky Selsoviet under the administrative jurisdiction of the town of oblast significance of Bor in Nizhny Novgorod Oblast; 
Zheleznodorozhny, Novosibirsk Oblast, a settlement in Novosibirsky District of Novosibirsk Oblast; 
Zheleznodorozhny, Perm Krai, a settlement in Usolsky District of Perm Krai
Zheleznodorozhny, Rostov Oblast, a khutor in Markinskoye Rural Settlement of Tsimlyansky District in Rostov Oblast; 
Zheleznodorozhny, Smolensk Oblast, a village in Vyazma-Bryanskoye Rural Settlement of Vyazemsky District in Smolensk Oblast
Zheleznodorozhny, Stavropol Krai, a settlement in Soldato-Alexsandrovsky Selsoviet of Sovetsky District in Stavropol Krai
Zheleznodorozhny, Tula Oblast, a settlement in Revyakinskaya Rural Territory of Yasnogorsky District in Tula Oblast
Zheleznodorozhny, Volgograd Oblast, a settlement in Shurupovsky Selsoviet of Frolovsky District in Volgograd Oblast
Zheleznodorozhnoye, Republic of Crimea, a selo in Bakhchisaraysky District of the Republic of Crimea
Zheleznodorozhnoye, Kaliningrad Oblast, a settlement in Dobrovolsky Rural Okrug of Krasnoznamensky District in Kaliningrad Oblast

Historical localities
Zheleznodorozhny, Moscow Oblast, a former city under the oblast jurisdiction in Moscow Oblast; since 2015—a part of the city of Balashikha 
Zheleznodorozhny, a former urban-type settlement in Chelyabinsk Oblast; since 2004—a part of the town of Kopeysk

Historical names
Zheleznodorozhny, in 1941–1985, the name of Yemva, a town in Knyazhpogostsky District of the Komi Republic;

References